The Dicastery for the Clergy, formerly named Congregation for the Clergy (formerly the Sacred Congregation for the Clergy and Sacred Congregation of the Council), is the dicastery of the Roman Curia responsible for overseeing matters regarding priests and deacons not belonging to religious orders. The Congregation for the Clergy handles requests for dispensation from active priestly ministry, as well as the legislation governing presbyteral councils and other organisations of priests around the world. The Congregation does not deal with clerical sexual abuse cases, as those are handled exclusively by the Congregation for the Doctrine of the Faith.

History 

It was commonly known as the Sacred Congregation of the Council. Pope Sixtus V's Apostolic Constitution Immensa aeterni Dei of 22 January 1587 expanded the Congregation's functions, entrusting it with the proper interpretation of the canons of the Council of Trent, resolving controversial questions relating to it, and monitoring provincial councils. It later lost many of its powers, retaining only those relating to disciplining secular clergy, but still held onto its original name prior to Pope Paul VI's apostolic constitution Regimini Ecclesiae Universae of 31 December 1967, which renamed it the "Congregation for the Clergy."

By 2009, Pope Benedict XVI made the Congregation responsible for managing the guidelines concerning clergy who maintained their clerical status after violating their vows of celibacy. On 25 January 2012, Pope Benedict XVI gave it responsibility for regulating Catholic seminaries, which until then was the responsibility of the Congregation for Catholic Education.

In January 2013, the motu proprio Fides per doctrinam transferred the competency on Catechesis from the Congregation for the Clergy to the Pontifical Council for the Promotion of the New Evangelisation.

In February 2019, Cardinal Beniamino Stella, Prefect of the Congregation, said that the Congregation manages the cases of priests who violate their vows of celibacy for approximately ten years. He said that "In such cases there are, unfortunately, Bishops and Superiors who think that, after having provided economically for the children, or after having transferred the priest, the cleric could continue to exercise the ministry." In February 2020, the Congregation made public its guidelines for managing cases of priests who have fathered children. The guidelines were previously secret, though in 2019 the Congregation offered to provide then to a bishops conference upon request.

On 3 June 2021, Pope Francis tasked Egidio Miragoli, Bishop of Mondovì, with conducting a review of the Congregation in anticipation of the replacement of its prefect in August. He expected it would take at least the month of June to complete.

Leadership

Since 2 August 2021, the prefect of the Congregation has been Archbishop Lazarus You Heung-sik. The secretary of the Congregation has been the Chilean archbishop Andrés Gabriel Ferrada Moreira since October 2021. In February 2022, Simone Renna was named under secretary.

Prefects

Documents
 General Directory for Catechesis

References

External links
 
 
 

 
1564 establishments in the Papal States
Catholic organizations established in the 16th century
Religious organizations established in the 1560s